Alexander Henry (1783 – 4 October 1862) was a British Radical politician.

Henry was elected Radical Member of Parliament for South Lancashire at a by-election in 1847—caused by Charles Pelham Villiers' decision to sit for another seat—and held the seat until 1852 when he did not seek re-election.

References

External links
 

Members of the Parliament of the United Kingdom for English constituencies
UK MPs 1847–1852
1783 births
1862 deaths